A non-stop flight is a flight by an aircraft with no intermediate stops.

History
During the early age of aviation industry when aircraft range was limited, most flights were served in the form of milk run, aka there were many stops along the route. But as aviation technology develop and aircraft capability improves, non-stop flights begin to take over and have now become a dominant form of flight in the modern times.

The dissolution of the Soviet Union in 1991 eventually opened up Russian airspace, allowing commercial airlines to exploit new circumpolar routes and enabling many new non-stop services, removing the need of making stopover in-between.

In the late 2000s to early 2010s, rising fuel prices coupled with economic crisis resulted in cancellation of many ultra-long haul non-stop flights. As fuel prices fell and aircraft became more economical the economic viability of ultra long haul flights improved.

Compare 

Direct flights and non-stop flights are often confused with each other. Starting March 31, 2019, American Airlines started offering non-stop flights from Phoenix, Arizona to London, England, meaning that the plane leaves Phoenix Sky Harbor International Airport and lands at Heathrow Airport. Conversely, a direct flight simply means that passengers typically would not get off the plane if it stops (lands) at a location between the two cities.

See also 

Domestic flight
Flight duration
Flight length
Longest flights
ETOPS/LROPS
International flight
Mainline
World's busiest passenger air routes

Notes

References

External links 
Understanding Travelspeak

Civil aviation